Donte Brangman (born 26 June 1994) is a Bermudian footballer who plays for Southampton Rangers and the Bermuda national team.

References

1991 births
Living people
Bermudian footballers
Association football midfielders
Bermuda international footballers
2019 CONCACAF Gold Cup players